When Calls the Heart is an American television drama series, inspired by Janette Oke's book of the same name from her Canadian West Series. Developed by Michael Landon Jr., the series began airing on the Hallmark Channel in the United States on January 11, 2014, and, in Canada, on April 16, 2014, on Super Channel.

On June 17, 2022, the series was renewed for a tenth season. As of May 22, 2022, 95 episodes of When Calls the Heart have aired, concluding the ninth season and of which includes five extended length holiday specials.

Series overview

Episodes

Season 1 (2014)

Season 2 (2015)

Special (2015)

Season 3 (2016)

Special (2016)

Season 4 (2017)

Special (2017)

Season 5 (2018)

Special (2018)

Season 6 (2019)

a.Season six was put on hold and "retooled" after Lori Loughlin's arrest, in relation to the 2019 college admissions bribery scandal, and her removal from all Crown Media Holdings projects.
b.Season six was originally planned to be 10 episodes; however, due to the combining of "Hope is With the Heart" with "Heart on My Sleeve", it was decreased to nine episodes.

Special (2019)

Season 7 (2020)

Season 8 (2021)

Season 9 (2022)

References

External links
 

Lists of American drama television series episodes